RCEP usually refers to the Regional Comprehensive Economic Partnership, a free trade agreement in the Asia-Pacific.

RCEP may also refer to:

 Royal Commission on Environmental Pollution (1970-2011) of the United Kingdom
 Royal Canadian Equity Party, of the 2006 Peterborough municipal election
 Revue Canadienne d'Évaluation de Programme, the alternative name for the bilingual English-French journal Canadian Journal of Program Evaluation 
 Registered Clinical Exercise Physiologist, of exercise physiology
 Registered Continuing Education Provider, for continuing education

See also